Susan Elizabeth Brown (born 6 May 1946) is an English actress of stage and screen. She had roles in the film The Iron Lady (2011) and the first season of the television series Game of Thrones (2011).

Brown has been nominated for a Tony Award for her performance in the 2018 revival of the play Angels in America and a Laurence Olivier Award for her performance in the 2018 play Home, I'm Darling.

Biography
Brown was born in Bristol, England. Before starting her professional career, Brown trained at Rose Bruford College. She has appeared in such stage productions as The Wild Duck (Donmar Warehouse), Henry IV Parts 1 & 2, Playing with Fire, Cardiff East and The Hour We Knew Nothing of Each Other (National Theatre), Easter, Romeo and Juliet, Richard III and Bad Weather (RSC), Road, Shirley, Downfall, Gibraltar Straight and Seagulls (Royal Court), Butterfly Kiss (Almeida), The House of Bernarda Alba and The Chairs (Gate Theatre), You Be Ted and I'll Be Sylvia (Hampstead), Playing Sinatra (Croydon Warehouse and Greenwich Theatre), The Beaux' Stratagem, Back to Methuselah, The Vortex, The Way of the World and A Woman of No Importance (Cambridge Theatre Company), Twelfth Night (English Touring Theatre), Small Change, Iphigenia (Sheffield Crucible) and Angels in America.

Brown played "Mrs Dimmock" a widow who comes across an oriental cannon, in an episode of Lovejoy, "The Peking Gun", in October 1993. To international audiences, Brown is perhaps best known for her role as Septa Mordane in the first series of Game of Thrones. Her character was killed off in the concluding episodes of the series. She had a supporting role as Margaret Thatcher's live-in carer June in The Iron Lady and has had small roles in BBC drama series Call the Midwife and Torchwood.

Filmography

Film

Television

Theatre

Audio

Video games

Awards and nominations

References

External links

 Hamilton Hodell – Susan Brown's Agency page
 TV.com profile

1946 births
Living people
Actresses from Bristol
English film actresses
English stage actresses
English television actresses